Alžběta Bášová (born 22 October 1993) is a Czech badminton player. Her parents, Petr Báša and Ludmila Bášová is also a Czech former badminton player.

Achievements

BWF International Challenge/Series (8 titles, 5 runners-up) 
Women's doubles

Mixed doubles

  BWF International Challenge tournament
  BWF International Series tournament
  BWF Future Series tournament

References

External links 
 

1993 births
Living people
Sportspeople from Hradec Králové
Czech female badminton players
Badminton players at the 2015 European Games
Badminton players at the 2019 European Games
European Games competitors for the Czech Republic